5120 Bitias  is a Jupiter trojan from the Trojan camp, approximately  in diameter. It was discovered on 13 October 1988, by American astronomer Carolyn Shoemaker at the Palomar Observatory in California. The assumed C-type asteroid has a rotation period of 15.2 hours. It was named after Bitias, a companion of Aeneus in Virgil's Aeneid.

Orbit and classification 

Bitias is a dark Jovian asteroid in a 1:1 orbital resonance with Jupiter. It is located in the trailering Trojan camp at the Gas Giant's  Lagrangian point, 60° behind on its orbit . It is also a non-family asteroid of the Jovian background population.

It orbits the Sun at a distance of 4.7–5.9 AU once every 12 years and 1 month (4,426 days; semi-major axis of 5.28 AU). Its orbit has an eccentricity of 0.11 and an inclination of 25° with respect to the ecliptic. The body's observation arc begins with its first observation at Palomar in September 1988, just one month prior to its official discovery observation.

Physical characteristics 

Bitias is an assumed, carbonaceous C-type asteroid. It has a low V–I color index of 0.78.

Rotation period 

In March 1993, a rotational lightcurve of Bitias was obtained from photometric observations over four consecutive nights by Stefano Mottola using the ESO 1-metre telescope at La Silla Observatory in Chile. Lightcurve analysis gave a rotation period of 11.582 hours with a brightness variation of at least 0.38 magnitude.

In August 2013, a more refined period determination from observations over seven consecutive nights by Robert Stephens at the Center for Solar System Studies gave a well-defined period of  hours with an amplitude of 0.32 magnitude.

Diameter and albedo 

According to the survey carried out by the NEOWISE mission of NASA's Wide-field Infrared Survey Explorer, Bitias measures between 47.987 and 47.99 kilometers in diameter and its surface has an albedo, while the Collaborative Asteroid Lightcurve Link assumes a standard albedo for a carbonaceous asteroid of 0.057 and calculates a diameter of 50.77 kilometers based on an absolute magnitude of 10.2.

Naming 

This minor planet was named by the discoverer from Greek mythology after the Trojan warrior Bitias. He survived the Trojan War and was a companion in Aeneas' exile. He was later killed in Italy with a whirling pike during the Latin War. The official naming citation was published by the Minor Planet Center on 4 June 1993.

Notes

References

External links 
 Asteroid Lightcurve Database (LCDB), query form (info )
 Dictionary of Minor Planet Names, Google books
 Discovery Circumstances: Numbered Minor Planets (5001)-(10000) – Minor Planet Center
 Asteroid 5120 Bitias at the Small Bodies Data Ferret
 
 

005120
Discoveries by Carolyn S. Shoemaker
Named minor planets
19881013